Syria participated in the 2010 Asian Games in Guangzhou from 12 November to 27 November 2010.

Medalists

Nations at the 2010 Asian Games
2010
Asian Games